Dakota Picture is a 2012 Indian Kannada-language film directed by Om Prakash Rao, starring Rockline Venkatesh, Nikesha Patel and Doddanna in lead roles.

Plot 
Anthony dies of shock when he learns he has won the lottery. Chaos ensues when the lottery ticket seller and others associated with Anthony try to claim the prize money.

Cast
 Rockline Venkatesh as Krishna
 Nikesha Patel as Radha
 Doddanna as Lachchanna
 Mukhyamantri Chandru as Halappa
 Shashikumar
 Om Prakash Rao 
 Sundar Raj 
 Umesh
 Mandeep Roy 
 Malathi Sardeshpande
 Raju Talikote as Anthony
 Rockline Sudhakar
 Sarigama Viji 
 Sneha Siyon

Reception 

A critic from The Times of India scored the film at 3 out of 5 stars and says "Though there is no leading star as hero, Rockline Venkatesh and Omprakash have managed to keep the movie alive. But it is Doddanna as lottery agent and Mukhya Manthri Chandru who steal the show with their good performance". A critic from The New Indian Express wrote "Camerawork by Jagadish Wali and songs by Hamsalekha are well delivered with the right amount of energy and madness maintained throughout the film. Verdict: This comedy flick remains a winner inspite of a few mishaps". B S S from Deccan Herald wrote "The Rockline-Omprakash Rao combo fails to foist their no-brainer comedy on the viewer successfully this time. If only more time and attention were bestowed on the screenplay! Dakota Picture remains just that". A critic from News18 India wrote "while Hamsalekha's background musical score is good. 'Dakota Picture' has nothing unusual to offer, but can be watched once for the efforts of veterans like Doddanna and Mukyamanthri Chandru". Srikanth Srinivasa from Rediff.com scored the film at 3 out of 5 stars and says "Hamsalekha's background score is praiseworthy. Dakota Picture is a watchable movie with a lot of funny moments. Only the title is a misnomer and may deter people from seeing this family entertainer. Just watch it and be entertained!". VS Rajapur from DNA wrote "Veterans Mukyamanthri Chandru and Doddanna have delivered their best performance in the film. Rockline Venkatesh puts in good efforts, but the film's heroine Nikisha has a lot to learn. Shashi Kumar, Raju Thalikote and Mandip Rai shine in their respective roles". A critic from Bangalore Mirror wrote "Hamsalekha, comes up with a couple of good compositions. For once, Omprakash has managed to copy from just one film and it has turned out good".

Notes

References

External links
 

2010s Kannada-language films
2012 films